The 1947 Harvard Crimson football team was an American football team that represented Harvard University during the 1947 college football season.  In its 11th season under head coach Dick Harlow, the team compiled a 4–5 record and was outscored by a total of 177 to 139.

On October 11, 1947, at Charlottesville, Virginia, Harvard's Chester Middlebrook Pierce became the first African-American player to appear in a football game at a predominantly white university located south of the Potomac.

Schedule

References

Harvard
Harvard Crimson football seasons
Harvard Crimson football
1940s in Boston